Smethwick by-election may refer to one of two by-elections to the British House of Commons in the Smethwick constituency in the West Midlands:

 1926 Smethwick by-election
 1945 Smethwick by-election

See also
 Smethwick (UK Parliament constituency)